Maypole is a village in the unparished area of Dartford, in the Borough of Dartford in Kent, England. It is located north of Joyden's Wood. In the 2021 census, Maypole had a population of 1,960.

References

External links

Villages in Kent